Cleveland Railway may refer to:
Cleveland Railway (England), United Kingdom
Cleveland Railway (Ohio), United States
Cleveland railway line, Brisbane, Queensland, Australia
Cleveland railway station, Brisbane, Queensland, Australia